Alan de Souza Guimarães (born 8 March 2000), simply known as Alan, is a Brazilian footballer who plays as an attacking midfielder for Portuguese club Moreirense, on loan from Palmeiras.

Career statistics

Club

References

2000 births
Living people
Footballers from São Paulo
Brazilian footballers
Brazil youth international footballers
Association football midfielders
Sociedade Esportiva Palmeiras players
Guarani FC players
Operário Ferroviário Esporte Clube players
Moreirense F.C. players
Campeonato Brasileiro Série B players
Liga Portugal 2 players
Brazilian expatriate footballers
Expatriate footballers in Portugal
Brazilian expatriate sportspeople in Portugal